Puquio (from Quechua: Pukyu, meaning "spring of water") is a town in Central Peru, South America.  It is the capital of the province Lucanas in the region Ayacucho.

References

Populated places in the Ayacucho Region